143 He Aapla Kalij Hayy ! is a 2022 Indian Marathi-language romantic tragedy film directed by Yogesh Pandurang Bhosale and produced by Sharda Films Production. The story, screenplay and dialogues of this movie are written by Dr. Bhalchandra Gaikwad. It stars Yogesh Bhosale, Shital Ahirrao, Vrushabh Shah, Shashank Shende, Suresh Vishwakarma in lead roles.

Cast 
 Yogesh Bhosale as Vishu 
 Shital Ahirrao as Madhu 
 Shashank Shende as Vishu's father
 Suresh Vishwakarma as Birasdar 
 Vrushabh Shah as Ananta

Release 
The film was released theatrically nationwide on 4 March 2022.

Soundtrack

References

External links 

2022 films
2020s Marathi-language films
Indian romantic drama films